The Nubra pika (Ochotona nubrica) is a species of mammal of the pika family, Ochotonidae. It is found in Bhutan, China, India, Nepal, and Pakistan.

References

Pikas
Mammals of Asia
Mammals of Tibet
Mammals of India
Mammals of Nepal
Mammals of Pakistan
Mammals described in 1922
Taxa named by Oldfield Thomas
Taxonomy articles created by Polbot